Gilad Hekselman (born 1983) is an Israeli-born, NYC-based jazz guitarist. He has performed with  Anat Cohen, Mark Turner, Dayna Stephens, Aaron Parks, Jeff Ballard, John Scofield, Ari Hoenig, Chris Potter and Joey Alexander.

Biography
Hekselman was born in Kfar Saba. He moved to New York City in 2004 to attend The New School for Jazz and Contemporary Music on a scholarship. In July 2005 he won the Gibson–Montreux Jazz Festival Guitar Competition in Switzerland.

Hekselman's albums include Splitlife (2006), Words Unspoken (2008), Hearts Wide Open (2011), This Just In (2013), and Homes (2015). Hekselman was featured on the album Radio Music Society by Esperanza Spalding.

Hekselman's working quartet includes saxophonist Mark Turner, bassist Joe Martin, and drummer Marcus Gilmore; they performed on NPR on The Checkout: Live in May 2012.

Hekselman lives in New York with his wife and their children.

Discography

As leader
 Splitlife (Smalls, 2006)
 Words Unspoken (LateSet, 2008)
 Hearts Wide Open (Le Chant du Monde, 2011)
 This Just In (Jazz Village, 2013)
 Homes (Jazz Village, 2015)
 Ask for Chaos (Motema, 2018)
 Further Chaos (Motéma, 2019)
 Trio Grande (Whirlwind, 2020)
 Far Star (Edition Records 2022)

As sideman
 Pat Bianchi, Back Home (Doodlin, 2010)
 Ari Hoenig, Lines of Oppression (self released, 2010)
 Anat Cohen, Notes from the Village (Anzic, 2008)
 Anat Cohen, Luminosa (Anzic, 2015)
 Lorraine Feather, Math Camp (Relarion, 2018)
 Ari Hoenig, Bert's Playground (Dreyfus, 2008)
 Ari Hoenig, NY Standard (Fresh Sound, 2018)
 Petros Klampanis, Chroma (Motema, 2017)
 Christian Sands, Reach (Mack Avenue, 2017)
 Esperanza Spalding, Radio Music Society (Heads Up, 2012)
 Ben Wendel, The Seasons (Motema, 2018)

References

1983 births
Living people
Israeli jazz musicians
Jazz guitarists
21st-century guitarists